Horaţiu Nicolau (5 July 1933 – 21 June 2018) was a Romanian volleyball player. He competed in the men's tournament at the 1964 Summer Olympics. 

After retiring as a player he coached teams in Belgium.

References

1933 births
2018 deaths
Romanian men's volleyball players
Olympic volleyball players of Romania
Volleyball players at the 1964 Summer Olympics
People from Vaslui County